The Straits of Mackinac are the short waterways between the U.S. state of Michigan's Upper and Lower Peninsulas, traversed by the Mackinac Bridge. Hydrologically, the two connected lakes are one body of water, known as Lake Michigan–Huron. Historically, the native Odawa people called the region around the Straits Michilimackinac.

The three islands forming the eastern edge of Straits of Mackinac include the two populated islands, the Bois Blanc and Mackinac, and one in between them that is uninhabited, the Round island. The Straits of Mackinac are major shipping lanes, providing passage for raw materials and finished goods and connecting, for instance, the iron mines of Minnesota to the steel mills of Gary, Indiana. Before the railroads reached Chicago from the east, most immigrants arrived in the Midwest and Great Plains by ships on the Great Lakes. The straits are five miles (8 km) wide at their narrowest point, where they are spanned by the Mackinac Bridge. Before the bridge was built, car ferries transported vehicles across the straits. Today passenger-only ferries carry people to Mackinac Island, which does not permit cars. Visitors can take their vehicles on a car ferry to Bois Blanc Island.

The straits are shallow and narrow enough to freeze over in the winter. Navigation is ensured for year-round shipping to the Lower Great Lakes by the use of icebreakers.

The straits were an important Native American and fur trade route. The Straits of Mackinac are named after Mackinac Island. The local Ojibwe Native Americans in the Straits of Mackinac region likened the shape of the island to that of a turtle, so they named the island Mitchimakinak, meaning "Big Turtle". When the British explored the area, they shortened the name to its present form: Mackinac.

Located on the southern side of the straits is the town of Mackinaw City, the site of Fort Michilimackinac, a reconstructed French fort founded in 1715, and on the northern side is St. Ignace, site of a French Catholic mission to the Indians, founded in 1671. The eastern end of the straits was controlled by Fort Mackinac on Mackinac Island, a British colonial and early American military base and fur trade center, founded in 1781.

History

A French Catholic mission to the Indians was founded at St. Ignace in 1671. In 1715, Fort Michilimackinac was built by the French on the south end of the straits' narrow. Michilimackinac was replaced in 1781 by a British fort, Fort Mackinac, on Mackinac Island.

Enbridge Line 5 was built in 1953 as an extension of the  Interprovincial Pipe Line Company line West of the iconic Mackinac Bridge bringing oil from Alberta to Lake Superior. On December 12, 2018, Michigan Governor Rick Snyder signed a bill establishing the Mackinac Straits Corridor Authority and appointed its first members.

Today

The straits are patrolled by a detachment of the United States Coast Guard based at Graham Point, St. Ignace. A shipping channel through the winter ice is maintained by the Coast Guard's Great Lakes icebreaker, USCGC Mackinaw, based in Cheboygan near the eastern edge of the Straits. This vessel went into service during the 2005/06 ice season.

Two ferry companies operate out of Mackinaw City and St. Ignace, connecting tourists and commuters to Mackinac Island: Shepler's Ferry and the Star Line Ferry.

Most of the Straits have been set aside by the state of Michigan as the Straits of Mackinac Shipwreck Preserve, a riparian public space dedicated to those personnel who were lost aboard the boats and ships that sank in these dangerous shipping lanes.

Lighthouses in the Straits of Mackinac include:
The Old Mackinac Point Light, in Mackinaw City, which is open to the public.
The Round Island Light on Round Island, which is not open to the public but which can be viewed from the Mackinac Island ferry channel.

Enbridge pipeline

West of the iconic Mackinac Bridge is Enbridge's pipeline, called Enbridge Line 5, which was built in 1953 as an extension of the  Interprovincial Pipe Line Company line bringing oil from Alberta to Lake Superior. In selling the idea of the pipeline to residents living near the Straits, the pipeline developers claimed, it was "essential to the defense of the United States and the whole North American continent". A University of Michigan study studied the risks of a leak, leading to experts and local governments calling for the shutdown of the pipeline.

In late June 2019, the state of Michigan filed a lawsuit asking the Ingham County Court to compel the decommissioning of the segment of Line 5 that runs under the Straits of Mackinac. A Reuters news report defined Line 5 as "a critical part of Enbridge’s Mainline network, which delivers the bulk of Canadian crude exports to the United States". The basis of the suit is the claim that the pipeline is a public nuisance and violates the Michigan Environmental Protection Act since it may become the source of pollution. The news report adds that "it is unclear if Line 5 could operate without the Straits segment".

Mackinac Straits Corridor Authority
On December 12, 2018, Michigan Governor Rick Snyder signed a bill establishing the Mackinac Straits Corridor Authority, which is charged with overseeing the construction and operation of a tunnel to hold a new Enbridge Line 5 under the lake bed in the straits. Snyder also appointed its first members: Geno Alessandrini of Iron Mountain, Anthony England of Ypsilanti, and Michael Zimmer of Dimondale, who serve six-year terms.

See also

Huron Lightship
Straits of Mackinac Shipwreck Preserve

References

External links

 Straits of Mackinac Shipwreck 
 Lighthouses in the Mackinac Strait
 Lighthouses of the Straits of Mackinac

Bodies of water of Cheboygan County, Michigan
Bodies of water of Emmet County, Michigan
Bodies of water of Mackinac County, Michigan
Marine parks of Michigan
Straits of Michigan
Lake Michigan
Lake Huron